St. Benedict Catholic Church is a Catholic church in downtown Greensboro, North Carolina. As the oldest Catholic church in Greensboro and one of the oldest churches in the Diocese of Charlotte, St. Benedict's is considered the Catholic mother church of the city.

History 
The very first Catholic Mass celebrated in Greensboro dates back to the 1870s. Very few Catholics lived in Greensboro at the time and traveling Benedictine priests from Belmont Abbey would come to provide Sacraments in the homes of Catholics. The first Catholic church, named St. Anne's and later St. Benedict's in honor of the Benedictine priests who served the Greensboro community, began construction in 1877 with the cornerstone being laid by Bishop James Gibbons of Richmond. The original church building was sold to the city of Greensboro in 1899 and became the Greensboro High School, the first public high school in Greensboro, now known as Grimsley Senior High School.

A new plot of land, between North Elm and Smith Streets, was purchased and is the current location of the church. St. Katherine Drexel, who was canonized in 2000 by Pope John Paul II, gave St. Benedict's Church $1,500 to help build the current church building, with the condition that a certain amount of pews would be reserved for African-American parishioners, encouraging the church to have an integrated congregation during the time of racial segregation in the southern United States. St. Benedict's used to have a Catholic school, which later was merged with St. Pius X Catholic School.

References 

African-American history of North Carolina
Roman Catholic churches in Greensboro, North Carolina
Roman Catholic Diocese of Charlotte
Roman Catholic churches completed in 1877
African-American Roman Catholic churches
19th-century Roman Catholic church buildings in the United States
1877 establishments in North Carolina